Washington Commercial Historic District is a national historic district located at Washington, Daviess County, Indiana.  The district encompasses 88 contributing buildings and 1 contributing object in the central business district of Washington. The district developed between about 1815 and 1940, and includes notable examples of Italianate, Federal, and Classical Revival style architecture.  Located in the district is the separately listed Daviess County Courthouse.  Other notable buildings include the City Hall (1916), Temple Court (1894), Peoples National Bank (1928), Masonic Building (1868, 1888), Indiana Theater (c. 1925), American Steam Laundry Building (c. 1930), Baltimore and Ohio Passenger Depot (1906), Westminster Presbyterian Church (1911), and U.S. Post Office (1916).

It was added to the National Register of Historic Places in 1990.

References

Washington, Indiana
Historic districts on the National Register of Historic Places in Indiana
Italianate architecture in Indiana
Federal architecture in Indiana
Neoclassical architecture in Indiana
Buildings and structures in Daviess County, Indiana
National Register of Historic Places in Daviess County, Indiana